Swan (Bulgarian: "Ле́бед", translit.: "Lébed") is a 1976 Bulgarian drama film, directed by Rumen Surdzhiyski. Screenplay writer  is Vladimir Ganev. Based on the story "Stubborn people" from the collection "Devil's tails" (1972), by the writer Ivailo Petrov. Cinematographer is Lachezar Videnov. Production designer is Anastas Yanakiev. The music of the film is composed by Bozhidar Petkov. Parts of the film were shot in Bankya, Sozopol, Sunny Beach and the cove of Alepù, at cape "Malkata Agalina".

Synopsis 
The Swan is considered one of the most beautiful of God's creatures. In a number of mythologies, it represents a sacred bird - a symbol of purity, harmony and nobility. Unfortunately, not all people are able to understand and judge it by its merits. When a hunting party, sees on their way a swan, one of the hunters decides to shoot it and kills the bird. The blindness for nature's beauty, leads to its lowering to the lowest of human needs. And for every barbaric act there is also a retribution.

Cast 

Georgi Kaloyanchev as Stoyanov
Yordan Spirov as Filipov
Mario Marinov as Dikov
Yavor Milushev as Milan
Vesko Zehirev as Gatyo
Georgi Popov
Antoaneta Krastnikova

Sources 
 "Encyclopedia Bulgarian Cinema AZ - Personalities, Films", Author: Alexander Yanakiev, Titra Publishing House, 2000, p. 425
 "Bulgarian Feature Films: Annotated Illustrated Filmography", Vol. 3 (1971-1980), Author: Galina Gencheva, Bulgarian National Film Library, Dr Ivan Bogorov Publishing House, 2008, 9789543160693, index 259, p.240

References

External links